Pavlo Gennadiyovich Ushivets (Ukrainian: Павло Геннадійович Ушивець, Russian: Павел Геннадьевич Ушивец, born 21 January 1987), better known as Mustang Wanted, is a Ukrainian urban climber and Internet celebrity. He is known for the high-altitude stunts he performs around the world with little or no safety equipment.

Biography
Ushivets was born in Kyiv, Ukraine and identifies as Heorhiy (or Grigory). He lives in Kyiv.

Urban climbing
He has climbed Vienna's Votivkirche, Princess Tower in Dubai and Most SNP in Bratislava.On 19–20 August 2014, he climbed Kotelnicheskaya Embankment Building, one of the Seven Sisters (a group of skyscrapers in Moscow designed in the Stalinist style), painted the spire in blue and raised the Ukrainian flag on the top of the building. He dedicated the performance to Independence Day of Ukraine (celebrated on 24 August). He suggested online that he was willing to be arrested by Russian police in exchange for the release of Ukrainian pilot Nadya Savchenko, who was captured by pro-Russian forces in eastern Ukraine and abducted to Russia. He received the 2014 Troublemaker Award for this stunt.

In September 2016, Ushivets attended the Toronto Film Festival, where he participated in the announcement of a new film based on his exploits and those of three Russian climbers. The film title is We Kill Death, and it will be  produced by Alex Ginzburg and Tony Lee.

In August 2017, Ushivets, during an interview with the Russian service of Radio Free Europe/Radio Liberty, announced that he will not do any more "provocative stunts" in Russia.

Filmography
 Netzwerk (Falls Like Rain) (2014) – music video for the band Klangkarussell
 Don't Look Down (Channel 4, 2014)

Awards
 Commemorative Fire-arm (2014), for painting the star on the Kotelnicheskaya Embankment Building

Gallery

References

External links 

1987 births
Living people
Urban climbers
Ukrainian mountain climbers
Pro-Ukrainian people of the 2014 pro-Russian unrest in Ukraine
People from Kyiv
Ukrainian Internet celebrities